The 11th Foreign Infantry Regiment was a regiment of the Foreign Legion in the French Army which served during World War II from 1939 to 1940.

History
The 11th Foreign Infantry Regiment was stationed in Lorraine, France from late 1939 to the spring of 1940.

The 11th REI defended the northern Inor Wood near Verdun from the German offensive early on in the battle until June 11, 1940, when the regiment began a fighting retreat to the south. By June 18, the 11th REI had lost three-fourths of its strength and the regiment withdrew to the south near Toul. The regimental flag was burned at Crezilles near Nancy to prevent it falling into German hands.

Organization 
The 11th Foreign Infantry Regiment was composed of 2,500 veterans of the Legion who had served in North Africa and 500 Legionnaire reservists.

See also 

Major (France)
Music of the Foreign Legion (MLE)
Peter J. Ortiz
12th Foreign Infantry Regiment

Notes

References 
Porch, Douglas. The French Foreign Legion: The Complete History of the Legendary Fighting Force. HarperCollins, New York, 1991.

External links 
 11e REI - History of the 11e REI

Foreign Infantry Regiment, 11th
1939 establishments in France
Military units and formations established in 1939
Military units and formations disestablished in 1940